Eikefjord Church is a parish church of the Church of Norway in Kinn Municipality in Vestland county, Norway. It is located in the village of Eikefjord. It is the church for the Eikefjord parish which is part of the Sunnfjord prosti (deanery) in the Diocese of Bjørgvin. The white, wooden church was built in 1812 using plans drawn up by an unknown architect. Originally, it was built in a long church design, but in 1874, the church was enlarged into a cruciform design. The church seats about 350 people.

History
Around 1810, the villagers of Eikefjord joined forces to get a church built in their community. Søren Agledal as the driving force among the residents. The first church in Eikefjord was built in 1812. It was a small long church with about 150-200 seats. The lead builder was Nils Olsen Kjørslevik. Originally, the church was privately owned, but it was sold to the parish in 1874 for 1000 Norwegian rigsdaler. Soon after the sale, the church was enlarged by adding a transept to the north and south sides of the nave to create a cruciform design. Each of the three cross-arms of the nave also had a 2nd floor seating gallery. The remodeling was led by the builder John J. Alver. In 1890, the Eikefjord area was separated from the rest of the Svanøy parish and it was established as its own parish. In 1936, a two-room sacristy was added to the east side of the church. In 1953, electric heating was installed in the church. During the 1970s, the church was modernized again. Running water, bathroom facilities, and electric lighting was all installed.

See also
List of churches in Bjørgvin

References

Kinn
Churches in Vestland
Cruciform churches in Norway
Wooden churches in Norway
19th-century Church of Norway church buildings
Churches completed in 1812
1812 establishments in Norway